Misheh Deh-e Sofla (also Romanized as Mīsheh Deh-e Soflá; also known as Mīsheh Deh Pa'īn) is a village in Lahijan-e Sharqi Rural District, Lajan District, Piranshahr County, West Azerbaijan Province, Iran. At the 2006 census, its population was 398, in 54 families.

References 

Populated places in Piranshahr County